In My Mind is the second studio album by Trinidadian-American singer Heather Headley. It was first released by RCA Records on January 31, 2006 in the United States. The album was delayed due to the Sony BMG merger, and Headley jokingly stated that it should be titled Caught Up. Headley worked with a variety of high-profile R&B and hip hop producers such as Jimmy Jam & Terry Lewis, Ne-Yo, Warryn Campbell, and Lil’ Jon on the album.
In My Mind debuted at number five on the US Billboard 200 and number one on the Billboard Top R&B/Hip-Hop Albums with first-week sales of 95,000 copies. On May 17, 2006, the Recording Industry Association of America (RIAA) certified the album gold for shipments of 500,000 units within the United States.

Critical reception

In his review for Allmusic, editor Andy Kellman wrote that "fans of mature R&B who were won over by Heather Headley's 2002 debut, This Is Who I Am, will hear much to like in her follow-up. Headley by and large proceeds with an "If it ain't broke, don't fix it" policy. She does sound more assured, which only works to her advantage with the mostly elegant and very musical set of arrangements that she fronts. Though the hooks aren't as immediate as what can be heard on Top 40 radio, the relationship insights and the manner in which they're compellingly conveyed are more than a fair trade-off." Mike Joseph from PopMatters found that "hearing love song after cheating song after being cheated on song makes In My Mind the textbook definition of a generic 'adult' R&B diva album [...] The problem that plagues Headley is the same problem that has plagued many an R&B singer over tim: She's only as good as her material lets her be."

Track listing

Notes
  signifies an additional producer
Samples
 "I Didn't Mean To" contains samples from Helen Reddy's "I Didn't Mean to Love You", written by Artie Butler, and Karen Philipp.

Charts

Weekly charts

Year-end charts

Certifications

Release history

References

2006 albums
Albums produced by Jimmy Jam and Terry Lewis
Albums produced by Lil Jon
Albums produced by Warryn Campbell
Heather Headley albums
RCA Records albums